Penha Circular is a neighborhood in the North Zone of Rio de Janeiro, Brazil It has been known for being a part of a bigger neighborhood called Penha but after it got too big, it was decided they should've been divided into more groups of neighborhoods like Penha, Bras de Pina, Vila da Penha and Penha Circular.

Neighbourhoods in Rio de Janeiro (city)